Phytobia optabilis is a species of fly in the genus Phytobia. It was described by Kenneth Spencer in 1977. According to Catalogue of Life, there are no known subspecies.

References

Agromyzidae